This is a township-level divisions of the province of Anhui, People's Republic of China (PRC). After province, prefecture, and county-level divisions, township-level divisions constitute the formal fourth-level administrative divisions of the PRC. There are a total of 1,507 such divisions in Anhui, divided into 225 subdistricts, 898 towns, 377 townships, and 7 ethnic townships. This list is divided first into the prefecture-level cities then the county-level divisions.

Hefei

Baohe District
Subdistricts
Changqing Subdistrict, Ningguo Road Subdistrict, Wuhu Road Subdistrict, Chaohu Road Subdistrict, Luogang Subdistrict, Yicheng Subdistrict

Towns
Feihe, Daxu

Luyang District
Subdistricts
Xinghuacun Subdistrict, Sanpailou Subdistrict, Guangming Subdistrict, Xianqiao Subdistrict, Bozhou Road Subdistrict, Shouchun Road Subdistrict, Shuanggang Subdistrict, Yimin Subdistrict, Anqing Road Subdistrict, Xiaoyaojin Subdistrict, Gulou Subdistrict, Haitang Subdistrict

Towns
Dayang

Townships
Sanshigang Township

Shushan District
Subdistricts 
 Daoxiangcun Subdistrict, Sanli'an Subdistrict, South Qili Station Subdistrict, Wulidun Subdistrict, West Yuanxicun Subdistrict, Huposhanzhuang Subdistrict, Heyedi Subdistrict, Maojiashan Subdistrict

Towns
Jinggang, Nangang

Yaohai District
Subdistricts
Chengdong Subdistrict, Shengli Road Subdistrict, Mingguang Road Subdistrict, Sanli Avenue Subdistrict, Tongling Road Subdistrict, Qilizhan Subdistrict, Datong Road Subdistrict, Hongguang Subdistrict, Heping Road Subdistrict, Chezhan Subdistrict

Towns 
Daxing

Townships
Modian Township.

Others
Yaohai Industrial Park, Longgang Development Zone

Chaohu City
Subdistricts:
Woniushan Subdistrict, Yafu Subdistrict, Tianhe Subdistrict, Bantang Subdistrict, Fenghuangshan Subdistrict, Zhongmiao Subdistrict

Towns:
Zhegao, Jiongyang, Huanglu, Huailin, Zhong'an, Sanbing, Suwan, Xiage, Bazhen, Yinping, Langanji

The only township is Miaogang Township

Changfeng County
Towns:
 Shuihu, Shuangdun, Gangji, Sanshitou, Xiatang, Wushan, Yangmiao, Zhuxiang, Zhuangmu

Townships:
 Luotang Township, Yijing Township, Zuodian Township, Duji Township, Zaojia Township, Taolou Township

Other:
Shuangfeng Development Zone

Feidong County
Towns
Dianbu, Zuozhen, Liangyuan, Qiatouji, Changlinhe, Shitang, Gucheng, Badou, Yuantuan, Bailong, Baogong

Townships 
 Zhongxing Township, Zhangji Township, Mahu Township, Chenji Township, Xiangdao Township, Yangdian Township, Paifang Hui and Manchu Ethnic Township

Feixi County
Towns
 Shangpai, Sanhe, Taohua, Huagang, Gaoliu, Guanxiang, Xiaomiao, Shannan, Fengle, Zipeng

Townships
 Gaodian Township, Mingchuan Township, Shishugang Township, Yandian Township

Other Areas
Taohua Industrial Park Management Committee, Zipengshan Management Committee

Lujiang County
Towns:
Lucheng, Yefushan, Tangchi, Wanshan, Jinniu, Leqiao, Guohe, Shitou, Baishan, Tongda, Ketan, Shengqiao, Longqiao, Baihu, Fanshan, Nihe, Luohe

Anqing

Daguan District
Subdistricts:
Yulin Road Subdistrict, Dekuan Road Subdistrict, Longshan Road Subdistrict, Jixuan Road Subdistrict, Huaxiang Road Subdistrict, Shihua Road Subdistrict, Linghu Subdistrict

Towns:
Haikou

Yingjiang District
Subdistricts:
Renmin Road Subdistrict, Huazhong Road Subdistrict, Xiaosu Road Subdistrict, Yicheng Road Subdistrict, Xinhe Road Subdistrict, Jianshe Road Subdistrict

Towns:
Changfeng, Xinzhou, Longshiqiao, Laofeng

Yixiu District
The only subdistrict is Daqiao Subdistrict

Towns:
Dalongshan, Luoling, Yangqiao

Townships:
Wuheng Township, Baizehu Township

Others:
Daqiao Economic Development Zone

Tongcheng
Subdistricts:
Longteng Subdistrict, Wenchang Subdistrict, Longmin Subdistrict

Towns:
Xindu, Shuanggang, Qingcao, Kongcheng, Daguan, Fangang, Jinshen, Lüting, Tangwan, Huangjia, Xunyu, Xizihu

Others:
Tongcheng Economic Development Zone, Tongcheng Shuangxin Economic Development Zone

Huaining County
Towns:
Gaohe, Shipai, Yueshan, Hongpu, Chaling, Jingong, Sanqiao, Huangdun, Jiangzhen, Xiaoshi, Lashu, Huanglong, Gongling, Pingshan, Mamiao

Townships:
Liangting Township, Xiushan Township, Qinghe Township, Leibu Township, Shijing Township

Qianshan County
Towns:
Meicheng, Huangni, Yuantan, Wanghe, Yujing, Huangpu, Shuihou, Huangbai, Guanzhuang, Chashui, Tianzhushan

Townships:
Youba Township, Doumu Township, Longtan Township, Wumiao Township, Tafan Township

Susong County
Towns:
Fuyu, Fuxing, Xuling, Xiacang, Erlang, Liangting, Poliang, Huikou, Changpu

Townships:
Chenhan Township, Aikou Township, Zuoba Township, Qianling Township, Jiugu Township, Chengling Township, Zhoutou Township, Wuli Township, Beiyu Township, Liuping Township, Zhifeng Township, Heta Township, Gaoling Township

Others:
九成监狱管理分局, 华阳河农场总场

Taihu County
Towns
 Jinxi, Xuqiao, Xiaochi, Xincang, Siqian, Tianhua, Niuzhen, Mituo, Beizhong, Baili
Townships
 Chengxi Township, Jiangtang Township, Dashi Township, Yangquan Township, Liufan Township

Wangjiang County
Towns
Huayang, Saikou, Yatan, Changling, Taici, Zhanghu, Gaotu, Yangwan

Townships:
 Leichi Township, Liangquan Township

Yuexi County
Towns:
Tiantang, Dianqian, Laipang, Changpu, Toutuo, Baimao, Wenquan, Xiangchang, Hetu, Wuhe, Zhubu, Yexi, Huangwei

Townships:
Lianyun Township, Qingtian Township, Baojia Township, Gufang Township, Tiantou Township, Zhongguan Township, Shiguan Township, Yaohe Township, Heping Township, Weiling Township, Maojianshan Township

Zongyang County
Seventeen towns:
Zongyang, Oushan, Tanggou, Laozhou, Chenyaohu, Zhoutan, Hengbu, Xiangpu, Qianqiao, Qilin, Yijin, Fushan, Huigong, Guanbuqiao, Qianpu, Jinshe, Bailiu

Five townships:
Tietong Township, Fengyi Township, Changsha Township, Baimei Township, Yutan Township

Other area:
Zongyang Economic Development Area

Bengbu

Bengshan District
Subdistricts:
Tianqiao Subdistrict, Qingnian Subdistrict, Wei'erlu Subdistrict, Huangzhuang Subdistrict, Hongyecun Subdistrict

Townships:
Xuehua Township, Yanshan Township

Huaishang District
The only subdistrict is Huaibin Subdistrict.

Towns
Xiaobengbu, Wuxiaojie, Caolaoji

The only township is Meiqiao Township.

Longzihu District
Subdistricts:
Zhihuai Subdistrict, Dongfeng Subdistrict, Dongsheng Subdistrict, Yan'an Subdistrict, Caoshan Subdistrict, Jiefang Subdistrict

The only town is Changhuaiwei, and the only township is Lilou Township

Yuhui District
Chaoyang Subdistrict, Diaoyutai Subdistrict, Zhanggongshan Subdistrict, Daqing Subdistrict, Weisi Subdistrict

Towns
 Qinji

Townships
Changqing Township

Huaiyuan County
Towns
 Tangji, Shuangqiaoji, Baoji, Macheng, Longkang, Heliu, Changfen, Weizhuang, Chengguan Town, Wanfu

Townships
 Zhaoying Township, Yingqian Township, Lanqiao Township, Xuwei Township, Chuji Township, Feihe Township, Feinan Township, Gucheng Township, Chenji Township

Wuhe County
Towns: 
Chengguan, Dongliuji, Xiaowei, Xiaoxi, Shuangzhongmiao, Xinji, Mohekou, Shenji, Wuqiao, Toupu, Huinan, Daxin, Zhuding

Townships
 Lunhu Township, Linbei Hui Township

Guzhen County
Towns
 Chengguan, Haocheng, Liancheng, Renqiao, Hugou, Xinmaqiao, Liuji, Wangzhuang

Townships
 Shihu Township, Yangmiao Township, Zhongxing Township

Bozhou

Qiaocheng District
Subdistricts:
Tangling Subdistrict, Huaxilou Subdistrict, Xuege Subdistrict

Towns:
Gujing, Shuanggou, Gucheng, Feihe, Dayang, Chengfu, Shihe, Shuangtang, Wuma, Weigang, Niuji, Lumiao, Longyang, Qiaodong, Shatu, Shibali, Shijiuli, Yanji

Townships:
Zhangdian Township, Zhaoqiao Township

Lixin County
Towns:
Wuren, Chengguan, Jiangji, Zhongtuan, Gongdian, Kantuan, Wangtuan, Ruji, Huji, Xipanlou, Yongxing, Wangshi, Jiucheng, Madianzi, Sunji, Chengjiaji, Zhangou, Zhangcun, Daliji

Townships:
Liujiaji Township, Xinzhangji Township, Jiwangchang Township, Sunmiao Township

Mengcheng County
Towns:
Maji, Chengguan, Yuefang, Xutuan, Tancheng, Letu, Licang, Sanyi, Chucun, Xiaojian, Shuangjian, Liba, Banqiaoji

Townships:
Xiaoxinji Township, Wangji Township

Others:
Fanji Industrial Park, Baiyang Forestry

Guoyang County
Subdistricts:
Chengguan Subdistrict, Chengxi Subdistrict, Chengdong Subdistrict, Guobei Subdistrict

Towns:
Xiyang, Guonan,  Qingtuan, Dancheng, Shiyin, Longshan, Caoshi, Dianji, Gaolu, Chudian, Gongjisi, Xinxing, Paifang, Chenda, Yimen, Huagou, Biaoli, Linhu, Gaogong, Madianji

Chizhou

Guichi District
Subdistricts:
Chiyang Subdistrict, Qiupu Subdistrict, Lishan Subdistrict, Jiangkou Subdistrict, Maya Subdistrict, Dunshang Subdistrict, Meilong Subdistrict, Qiujiang Subdistrict, Xinghuacun Subdistrict, Qingfeng Subdistrict, Qingxi Subdistrict

Towns:
Yinhui, Niutoushan, Wusha, Meijie, Meicun, Tangtian, Pailou, Tangxi, Juanqiao

Dongzhi County
Towns:
Yaodu, Dongliu, Longquan, Xiangyu, Zhangxi, Yanghu, Gegong, Dadukou, Guangang, Zhaotan, Nixi

Townships:
Muta Township, Huayuanli Township, Qingshan Township

Shitai County
Towns:
Renli, Hengdu, Xianyu, Qidu, Xiaohe, Dingxiang

Townships:
Dayan Township, Jitan Township

Other: 
Shitai Dadukou Development Zone

Qingyang County
Towns
 Rongcheng, Muzhen, Dingqiao, Xinhe, Zhubei, Lingyang, Yangtian, Miaoqian

Townships
Qiaomu Township, Youhua Township, Ducun Township

Chuzhou

Langya District
Subdistricts:
Langya Subdistrict, Yangzi Subdistrict, Qingliu Subdistrict, Dongmen Subdistrict, Ximen Subdistrict, Nanmen Subdistrict, Beimen Subdistrict, Fenghuang Subdistrict, Chengbei New Area Subdistrict, Xijian Subdistrict

Nanqiao District
The only subdistrict is Dawang Subdistrict

Towns:
Wuyi, Shahe, Zhangguang, Nannigang, Daliu, Jiaopu, Zhulong, Shiji

Mingguang
Subdistricts:
Mingdong Subdistrict, Mingnan Subdistrict, Mingxi Subdistrict, Mingguang Subdistrict

Towns:
Jianxi, Guandian, Nüshanhu, Zilaiqiao, Sanjie, Shiba, Suxiang, Zhangbaling, Qiaotou, Gupei, Pancun, Liuxiang

The only township is Bogang Township

Tianchang
The only subdistrict is Tianchang Subdistrict

Towns:
Tongcheng, Chajian, Qinlan, Datong, Yangcun, Shiliang, Jinji, Yeshan, Zhengji, Zhangpu, Xinjie, Wanshou, Yongfeng, Renheji

Dingyuan County
Towns:
Dingcheng, Luqiao, Zhangqiao, Chihe, Jiangji, Zhuwan, Lianjiang, Cang, Jiepaiji, Xisadian, Yongkang, Sangjian, Sanheji, Outang, Daqiao, Wuxu

Townships:
Qilitang Township, Nengren Township, Erlong Hui Ethic Township, Fangang Township, Yanqiao Township, Fuxiao Township

Other areas:
 Dingyuan Economic and Technological Development Zone, Dingyuan Salt Chemical Industrial Park, Lingjiahu Farm

Fengyang County
Towns:
Banqiao, Damiao, Fucheng, Guantang, Hongxin, Liufu, Wudian, Xiquan, Linhuaiguan, Zaoxiang, Yinjian, Zongpu, Xiaoxihe, Daxihe

The only township is Huangwan Township

Lai'an County
Towns:
Xin'an, Chahe, Banta, Shuikou, Shunshan, Leiguan, Shiguan, Daying

Townships:
Yangying Township, Zhangshan Township, Dushan Township, Sancheng Township

Quanjiao County
Towns:
Xianghe, Wugang, Shizi, Liuzhen, Erlangkou, Xiwang, Machang, Dashu, Shipei, Guhe

Fuyang

Yingdong District
Subdistricts:
Xinhua Subdistrict, Xiangyang Subdistrict, Hedong Subdistrict

Towns:
Kouzi, Laomiao, Zhengwu, Chahua, Yuanzhai, Xinwujiang, Ranmiao

Townships:
Zaozhuang Township, Yanglouzi Township

Yingquan District
Subdistricts:
Zhongshi Subdistrict, Zhoupeng Subdistrict

Towns:
Renming, Ninglaozhuang, Wenji, Hangliu

Yingzhou District
Subdistricts:
Yingxi Subdistrict, Gulou Subdistrict, Qinghe Subdistrict, Wenfeng Subdistrict

Towns:
Wangdian, Chengji, Xihu, Sanhe, Yuanji, Sanshilipu, Jiulong

Townships:
Mazhai

Jieshou
Subdistricts:
Xicheng Subdistrict, Yingnan Subdistrict, Dongcheng Subdistrict

Towns:
Tianying, Guji, Wangji, Xinmaji, Lucun, Dahuang, Taomiao, Yangquan, Shuzhuang, Daiqiao, Guangwu, Zhuanji

Townships:
Renzhai Township, Jinzhai Township, Bingji Township

Funan County
Towns:
Fangji, Zhonggang, Chaiji, Xincun, Santa, Zhuzhai, Liugou, Zhaoji, Tianji, Miaoji, Huanggang, Jiaobei, Zhangzhai, Wangshi, Dicheng, Hongheqiao, Wangjiaba, Wanghua, Caoji, Lucheng, Huilong

Townships:
Wangdianzi Township, Xutang Township, Duanying Township, Gongqiao Township, Longwang Township, Yuji Township, Laoguan Township, Gaotai Township

Linquan County
Towns:
Chengguan, Yangqiao, Tongcheng, Tanpeng, Laoji, Huaji, Lüzhai, Danqiao, Changguan, Songji, Zhangxin, Aiting, Chenji, Weizhai, Yingxian, Wadian, Jiangzhai, Miaocha, Huangling, Baimiao, Guanmiao

Townships:
Niuzhuang Township, Gaotang Township, Fanxingji Township, Tupi Township, Xieji Township, Yangxiaojie Township, Taolao Township, Tianqiao Township, Zhangying Township, Pangying Township

Taihe County
Towns:
Chengguan, Jiuxian, Shuizhen, Pitiaosun, Yuanqiang, Niqiu, Lixing, Daxin, Xiaokou, Guanji, Santa, Shuangfu, Caimiao, Santang, Miaolaoji, Zhaomiao, Gongji, Fentai, Hongshan, Qingqian, Wuxing, Gaomiao, Sangying, Damiaoji, Ruanqiao, Shuangmiao

Townships:
Huzong Township, Zhaoji Township, Guomiao Township, Maji Township, Erlang Township

Yingshang County
Towns:
Shencheng, Xieqiao, Nanzhao, Yanghu, Liushipu, Jiangkou, Runhe, Xinji, Gengpeng, Bangang, Wanggang, Xiaqiao, Chenqiao, Huangqiao, Jiangdianzi, Digou, Balihe, Xisanshipu, Shibalipu, Lukou, Hongxin

Townships:
Jianyi Township, Shengtang Township, Liuji Township, Gucheng Township, Huangba Township, Wushipu Township, Guantun Township, Saijian Hui Ethnic Township

Huaibei

Duji District
Subdistricts:
Gaoyue Subdistrict, Kuangshanji Subdistrict

Towns:
Duanyuan, Shuoli, Shitai

Lieshan District
Subdistricts:
Yangzhuang Subdistrict, Renlou Subdistrict, Linhaitong Subdistrict, Baishan Subdistrict

Towns:
Songting, Lieshan Town, Gurao

Xiangshan District
Subdistricts:
Renxu Subdistrict, Xiangnan Subdistrict, Renminlu Subdistrict, Quyang Subdistrict, Dongqu Subdistrict, Dongshan Subdistrict, Sandikou Subdistrict, Xiqu Subdistrict, Liuqiao Subdistrict, Nanli Subdistrict, Dong Subdistrict, Xi Subdistrict

The only town is Qugou

Suixi County
Towns:
Suixi Town, Liuqiao, Shuangduiji, Baishan, Nanping, Wugou, Linhuan, Hancun, Tiefo, Sunting

The only township is Sibo Township

Huainan

Bagongshan District
Subdistricts:
Xinzhuangzi Subdistrict, Tubazi Subdistrict, Bijiagang Subdistrict

Towns:
Bagongshan Town, Shanwang

Other:
Miaoshan Forestry

Datong District
The only subdistrict is Datong Subdistrict

Towns:
Shangyao, Luohe, Jiulonggang

The only township is Kongdian Township

Panji District
The only subdistrict is Tianji Subdistrict

Towns:
Panji Town, Luji, Pingxu, Gaohuang, Jiahe, Nihe

Townships:
Hetuan Township, Jiagou Township, Qiji Township, Gugou Hui Ethnic Township

Tianjia'an District
Subdistricts:
Dongshan Subdistrict, Huaibin Subdistrict, Tiandong Subdistrict, Longquan Subdistrict, Guoqing Subdistrict, Chaoyang Subdistrict, Quanshan Subdistrict, Gongyuan Subdistrict, Xinhuai Subdistrict

Xiejiaji District
Subdistricts:
Xiejiaji Subdistrict, Caijiagang Subdistrict, Lixin Subdistrict, Pingshan Subdistrict, Xiesancun Subdistrict

Towns:
Wangfenggang, Liyingzi, Tangshan, Yanggong

Townships:
Sunmiao Township, Gudui Hui Ethnic Township

Fengtai County
Towns:
Chengguan, Xinji, Yuezhangji, Zhumadian, Guqiao, Maoji, Xiaji, Guiji, Jiaoganghu, Fenghuang

Townships:
Guandian Township, Gudian Township, Shangtang Township, Liuji Township, Dingji Township, Qianmiao Township, Yangcun Township, Daxingji Township, Lichong Hui Ethnic Township

Shou County
Towns:
Shouchun, Shuangqiao, Liugang, Jiangou, Banqiao, Baoyi, Anfeng, Anfengtang, Xiaodian, Dashun, Zhongxing, Yanliu, Wabu, Zhengyangguan, Shikou, Shuangmiaoji, Yinxian, Fengzhuang, Sanjue, Cha'an, Yinghe

Townships:
Zhangli Township, Bagongshan Township, Yaokou Township, Taodian Hui Ethnic Township

Huangshan City

Huangshan District
The only subdistrict is Xincheng Subdistrict

Towns:
Gantang, Xianyuan, Taipinghu, Gengcheng, Tanjiaqiao, Tangkou, Sankou, Jiaocun, Wushi

Townships:
Xinfeng Township, Xinhua Township, Yongfeng Township, Longmen Township, Xinming Township

Huizhou District
Towns:
Yansi, Xixinan, Qiankou, Chengkan

Townshisp:
Qiashe Township, Fuxi Township, Yangcun Township

Tunxi District
Subdistricts:
Yudong Subdistrict, Yuzhong Subdistrict, Yuxi Subdistrict, Laojie Subdistrict

Towns:
Tunguang, Liyang, Yanghu, Yiqi, Xintan

Qimen County
Towns:
Qishan, Pingli, Jinzipai, Shanli, Likou, Xiaolukou, Anling, Fufeng

Townships:
Rongkou Township, Tafang Township, Luxi Township, Guxi Township, Xin'an Township, Ruokeng Township, Baixi Township, Qihong Township, Datan Township, Zhukou Township

She County
Towns:
Huicheng, Xucun, Shendu, Xitou, Chakou, Xiakeng, Bei'an, Jiekou, Guilin, Fu'ai, Zhengcun, Wangcun, Qizili

Townships:
Hangkou Township, Jinchuan Township, Changxi Township, Sanyang Township, Changgai Township, Xiaochuan Township, Xiongcun Township, Shangfeng Township, Wuyang Township, Sencun Township, Shimen Township, Huangtian Township, Shaolian Township, Shishi Township, Xinxikou Township

Xiuning County
Towns:
Haiyang, Qiyunshan, Wan'an, Wucheng, Lantian, Donglinxi, Xikou, Liukou, Wangcun, Shangshan

Townships:
Weiqiao Township, Shandou Township, Lingnan Township, Yuanfang Township, Yucun Township, Huangjian Township, Longtian Township, Baiji Township, Chenxia Township, Banqiao Township, Hecheng Township

Yi County
Towns:
Biyang, Jilian, Yuting

Townships:
Longjiang Township, Bishan Township, Xiwu Township, Kecun Township, Meixi Township, Hongtan Township, Dongyuan Township, Sixi Township, Hongxing Township

Lu'an

Jin'an District
Subdistricts:
Wangcheng Subdistrict, Qingshuihe Subdistrict, Zhongshi Subdistrict, Sanliqiao Subdistrict, Dongshi Subdistrict

Towns:
Zhangdian, Maotanchang, Shiqiao, Chunshu, Dongqiao, Sungang, Matou, Donghekou, Muchang, Sanshipu, Shuanghe

Townships:
Zhongdian Township, Chengbei Township, Xianshengdian Township, Weidong Township, Wengdun Township, Hengtanggang Township

Yeji District
Towns:
Yeji, Sanyuan

Townships:
Sungang

Yu'an District
Subdistricts:
Gulou Subdistrict, Xishi Subdistrict, Xiaohuashan Subdistrict

Towns:
Subu, Hanbaidu, Xin'an, Shunhe, Shipozhuang, Dushan, Chengnan, Dingji, Guzhen, Xuji, Fenlukou, Jiangjiadian

Townships:
Danwang Township, Qingshan Township, Shibanchong Township, Xihekou Township, Pingqiao Township, Luoji Township

Huoqiu County
Towns:
Chengguan, Yaoli, Hongji, Caomiao, Zhongxingji, Xiadian, Wulong, Huhu, Longtan, Shidian, Fengjing, Linshui, Gaotang, Chalu, Xindian, Mengji, Huayuan, Zhouji, Madian, Changji, Hekou, Yeji

Townships:
Songdian Township, Sanliu Township, Chengxihu Township, Linhuaigang Township, Shaogang Township, Bailian Township, Fanqiao Township, Wangdailiu Township, Panji Township, Pengta Township, Fengling Township

Huoshan County
Towns:
Hengshan, Danjiamiao, Foziling, Heishidu, Luo'erling, Xiafuqiao, Shangtushi, Yu'erjie, Manshuihe, Mozitan, Zhufo'an, Dahuaping

Townships:
Taipingfan Township, Dongxixi Township, Danlongsi Township, Taiyang Township

Jinzhai County
Towns:
Meishan, Shuanghe, Nanxi, Gubei, Qingshan, Tiantangzhai, Wujiadian, Mabu, Tangjiahui, Banzhuyuan, Yanzihe

Townships:
Baitafan Township, Youfangdian Township, Huaishuwan Township, Huashi Township, Shahe Township, Taoling Township, Tiechong Township, Changling Township, Zhangchong Township, Guanmiao Township, Guoziyuan Township, Quanjun Township

Shucheng County
Towns:
Chengguan, Taoxi, Qianrenqiao, Hangbu, Baishenmiao, Wuxian, Nangang, Shucha, Ganchahe, Wanfohu, Shanqi, Xiaotian, Tangchi, Hepeng, Zhangmuqiao

Townships:
Chunqiu Township, Bolin Township, Quedian Township, Tangshu Township, Luzhen Township, Gaofeng Township

Ma'anshan

Huashan District
Subdistricts:
Huoli Subdistrict, Shatang Road Subdistrict, Jiefang Road Subdistrict, Hudong Road Subdistrict, Taoyuan Road Subdistrict

Jinjiazhuang District
Subdistricts:
Jinjiazhuang Subdistrict, Tangxi Subdistrict, Cihu Subdistrict, Jiangbian Subdistrict

The only township is Cihu Township

Yushan District
Subdistricts:
Pinghu Subdistrict, Anmin Subdistrict, Yushan Subdistrict, Caishi Subdistrict

Towns:
Xiangshan, Yintang

The only township is Jiashan Township

Dangtu County
Towns:
Gushu, Xinshi, Taibai, Bowang, Huangchi, Danyang, Tangnan, Wuxi, Shiqiao, Huhe, Huyang, Niandou

Townships:
Jiangxin Township, Dalong Township

Hanshan County
Towns:
Huanfeng, Yuncao, Xianzong, Qingxi, Lintou, Tongzha, Taochang, Zhaoguan

He County
Towns:
Liyang, Shenxiang, Baiqiao, Laoqiao, Gongqiao, Xibu, Xiangquan, Wujiang, Shanhou, Shiyang

Suzhou

Yongqiao District
Subdistricts:
Daodong Subdistrict, Dongguan Subdistrict, Xiguan Subdistrict, Nanguan Subdistrict, Beiguan Subdistrict, Bianhe Subdistrict, Sanliwan Subdistrict, Tuohe Subdistrict, Yongqiao Subdistrict, Chengdong Subdistrict, Chengxi Subdistrict

Towns:
Caocun, Chulan, Fuli, Dadian, Daying, Huidian, Jiagou, Langan, Qixian, Luling, Shichun, Yaoyuan, Xisipo, Yong'an, Zhuxianzhuang

Townships:
Beiyangzhai Township, Haohe Township, Miao'an Township, Jieji Township, Shunhe Township, Taogou Township, Xi'erpu Township, Yangzhuang Township, Yongzhen Township, Zhihe Township

Dangshan County
Towns:
Dangcheng, Lizhuang, Xuanmiao, Guanzhuangba, Zhouzhai, Caozhuang, Guandimiao, Liangli, Zhulou, Chengzhuang, Wenzhuang, Xin'anmen, Tangzhai, Geji

Townships:
Huanglou Township, Zhaotun Township, Quanji Township, Liu'anlou Township

Lingbi County
Towns:
Lingcheng, Weiji, Huangwan, Louzhuang, Yinji, Youji, Yangtuan, Xialou, Chaoyang, Yugou, Gaolou, Fengmiao, Huigou

Townships:
Xiangyang Township, Zhuji Township, Dalu Township, Damiao Township, Chantang Township, Yuji Township

Si County
Towns:
Sicheng, Pingshan, Huangxu, Dazhuang, Shantou, Liuxu, Heita, Caomiao, Caogou, Dunji, Dinghu, Changgou

Townships:
Dalukou Township, Dayang Township, Wafang Township

Xiao County
Towns:
Longcheng, Huangkou, Dingli, Xinzhuang, Qinglong, Majing, Baitu, Datun, Dulou, Guanqiao, Yanglou, Liutao, Wangzhai, Yanji, Yonggu, Zhangzhuangzhai, Zhaozhuang, Zulou

Townships:
Shilin Township, Shengquan Township, Jiudian Township, Zhuangli Township, Sunweizi Township

Tongling

Jiaoqu
The only subdistrict is Qiaonan Subdistrict

Towns:
Datong, Tongshan

The only township is Huihe Township

Other:
Anqing Mining District Office (安庆矿区办事处)

Shizishan District
Subdistricts:
Shizishan Subdistrict, Xinmiao Subdistrict, Cuihu Subdistrict, Fenghuangshan Subdistrict, Dongjiao Subdistrict

The only town is Xihu

Other:
Shizishan Economic Development Zone

Tongguanshan District
Subdistricts:
Changjiang Road Subdistrict, Shicheng Road Subdistrict, Tongguanshan Subdistrict, Yangjiashan Subdistrict, Saobagou Subdistrict, Henggang Subdistrict

Tongling County
Towns:
Wusong, Shun'an, Zhongming, Tianmen

Townships:
Donggeng Township, Xigeng Township, Xuba Township, Laozhou Township

Wuhu

Jinghu District
Subdistricts:
Beijing Road Subdistrict, Zhelu Subdistrict, Jinghu Subdistrict, Jihe Subdistrict, Zheshan Subdistrict, Gejishan Subdistrict, Tingtang Subdistrict, Tianmenshan Subdistrict, Beimen Subdistrict, Dongmen Subdistrict, Jingshan Subdistrict

The only town is Fangcun

Jiujiang District
Subdistricts:
Qingshui Subdistrict, Guandou Subdistrict, Wanli Subdistrict, Siheshan Subdistrict, Yuxijiang Subdistrict

Other:
Jiujiang Economic and Technological Development Zone

Sanshan District
Subdistricts:
Sanshan Subdistrict, Baoding Subdistrict, Longhu Subdistrict

The only town is Eqiao

Yijiang District
Subdistricts:
Yijiangqiao Subdistrict, Limin Road Subdistrict, Matang Subdistrict, Lugang Subdistrict, Huolong Subdistrict, South Zhongshan Road Subdistrict, Baima Subdistrict

Fanchang County
Towns:
Fanyang, Eshan, Pingpu, Xingang, Suncun, Huogang

Nanling County
Towns:
Jishan, Yijiang, Xuzhen, Sanli, Hewan, Gongshan, Jiafa, Yandun, Jiafa

Wuhu County
Towns:
Wanzhi, Liulang, Taoxin, Hongyang, Huaqiao

Wuwei County
Towns:
Wucheng, Xiang'an, Erba, Tanggou, Dougou, Shijian, Yanqiao, Kaicheng, Shushan, Niubu, Liudu, Yaogou, Nicha, Baimao, Fudu, Gaogou, Quantang, Hongmiao, Hedian

Townships:
Hemao Township, Hongxiang Township, Kunshan Township, Shilidun Township

Xuancheng

Xuanzhou District
Subdistricts:
Shuangqiao Subdistrict, Jichuan Subdistrict, Chengjiang Subdistrict, Aofeng Subdistrict, Xilin Subdistrict, Jingtingshan Subdistrict, Feicai Subdistrict

Towns:
Shuiyang, Liqiao, Shencun, Guquan, Honglin, Hanting, Wenchang, Xikou, Zhouwang, Xintian, Yangliu, Shuidong, Xiangyang, Sunbu

Towns:
Zhuqiao Township, Yangxian Township, Wuxing Township, Jinba Township, Huangdu Township

Ningguo
Subdistricts:
Xijin Subdistrict, Heli Subdistrict, Nanshan Subdistrict, Wangxi Subdistrict, Zhufeng Subdistrict, Tianhu Subdistrict

Towns:
Zhongxi, Gangkou, Ningdun, Xiaxi, Xianxia, Meilin, Jialu, Hule

Townships:
Yunti Township, Nanji Township, Wanjia Township, Qinglong Township, Fantang Township

Guangde County
Towns:
Taozhou, Xinhang, Qiucun, Baidian, Shijie

Townships:
Lucun Township, Sihe Township, Yangtan Township, Dongting Township

Langxi County
Towns:
Nanfeng, Xinfa, Meizhu, Taocheng, Shizi, Biqiao, Dongxia, Jianping

Townships:
Xingfu Township, Feili Township, Yaocun Township, Lingda Township

Jing County
Towns:
Maolin, Langqiao, Huangcun, Dingjiaqiao, Jingchuan, Caicun, Yunling

Townships:
Changqiao Township, Tingxi Township

Jixi County
Towns:
Huayang, Chang'an, Fuling, Jinsha, Shangzhuang, Yangxi, Linxi, Yingzhou

Townships:
Jiapeng Township, Jingzhou Township, Banqiaotou Township

Jingde County
Towns:
Jingyang, Baidi, Sanxi, Miaoshou, Caijiaqiao

Townships:
Banshu Township, Yucun Township, Suncun Township, Xinglong Township, Yunle Township

References

 
Anhui
Townships